"Break Down the Walls" is a song by British rock band Asking Alexandria. It is the fifth single released from their album From Death to Destiny, on 21 October 2013. The album version of the song was mixed by David Bendeth, but the single version was mixed by Kevin Churko.

Personnel 
 Danny Worsnop – lead vocals, additional guitar
 Ben Bruce – lead guitar, backing vocals
 Cameron Liddell – rhythm guitar
 Sam Bettley – bass
 James Cassells – drums

Charts

References 

Asking Alexandria songs
2014 singles
2013 songs
Songs written by Ben Bruce
Songs written by Danny Worsnop
Sumerian Records singles
Songs written by Logan Mader
Songs written by Jussifer